Mavungal is a town in Kerala, India, situated just 3 km away from the city of Kanhangad. Mavungal is one of the busiest transport hubs in Kasaragod district. It connects Kasaragod on the north, Kannur on the south, Kanhangad on the west and hill towns Panathur, Sullia and Madikeri on the east, making it one of the major junction in the region.

Healthcare
Sunrise Hospital
Sanjeevani Institute of Medical Science

Places of Interest

Anandashram
The famous Anandashram, Kanhangad is situated in Mavungal. The junction also has a Transport Bus depot.

Kanhangad area

References